Tomás António Garcia Rosado,  (4 March 1854 in Beja, Portugal – 30 August 1937 in Sintra, Portugal) was an infantry officer and general of the Portuguese Army.

Life 
In 1895, after accompanying Afonso, Duke of Porto to Portuguese India, he received the 344th Grand Cross in the  Order of the Tower and Sword.

He stayed in Mozambique in 1897-1898, and returned there to be Governor between 1902 and 1905.

As a general, he replaced on 25 August 1918 Fernando Tamagnini de Abreu e Silva as commander of the Portuguese Expeditionary Corps (CEP), a 55,000 men army corps that fought with the Allies in the Western Front, during World War I.

After his return, he became chief of the General Staff of the Portuguese Army between 1919 and 1924.

Between 1926 and 1934, he was Portuguese Ambassador to the United Kingdom.

1854 births
1937 deaths
Governors-General of Mozambique
Knights Commander of the Order of St Michael and St George
Portuguese generals
Portuguese military personnel of World War I
People from Beja, Portugal
19th-century Portuguese people
Ambassadors of Portugal to the United Kingdom